Aristolochia arborea is a species of perennial plant in the family Aristolochiaceae. It is found from Mexico through Guatemala and El Salvador .

References

External links

arborea
Plants described in 1862